David Rappaport was an English actor.

David Rappaport may also refer to: 

David Rappaport (designer), fashion manufacturer and designer
David Rapaport, clinical psychologist 
David Rappoport, rabbi and rosh yeshiva